Scapa Flow is a body of water in the Orkney Islands, Scotland, sheltered by the islands of Mainland, Graemsay, Burray, South Ronaldsay and Hoy. Its sheltered waters have played an important role in travel, trade and conflict throughout the centuries. Vikings anchored their longships in Scapa Flow more than a thousand years ago. It was the United Kingdom's chief naval base during the First and Second World Wars, but the facility was closed in 1956.

Since the scuttling of the German fleet after World War I, its wrecks and their marine habitats form an internationally acclaimed diving location.

Scapa Flow hosts an oil port, the Flotta Oil Terminal. In good weather, its roadstead (water of moderate conditions) allows ship-to-ship transfers of crude oil product. The world's first ship-to-ship transfer of liquefied natural gas (LNG) took place in Scapa Flow in 2007 transferring 132,000m³ of LNG. This occurred in 2007 by Excelerate Energy between the vessels Excalibur and Excelsior.

History

Viking era
The Viking expeditions to Orkney are recorded in detail in the 11th century Orkneyinga sagas and later texts such as the Hákonar saga Hákonarsonar.

According to the latter, King Haakon IV of Norway anchored his fleet, including the flagship Kroussden that could carry nearly 300 men, on 5 August 1263 at St Margaret's Hope, where he saw an eclipse of the sun before he sailed south to the Battle of Largs.

En route back to Norway Haakon anchored some of his fleet in Scapa Flow for the winter, but he died that December while staying at the Bishop's Palace in Kirkwall. In the 15th century towards the end of Norse rule in Orkney, the islands were run by the jarls from large manor farms, some of which were at Burray, Burwick, Paplay, Hoy, and Cairston (near Stromness) to guard the entrances to the Flow.

Wars of the Three Kingdoms
In 1650 during the wars of the Three Kingdoms, the Royalist general James Graham, 1st Marquess of Montrose, moored his ship, the Herderinnan, in Scapa Flow, in preparation for his attempt to raise a rebellion in Scotland. The enterprise ended in failure and rout at the Battle of Carbisdale.

First World War

Base for the British Grand Fleet
Historically, the main British naval bases were near the English Channel to counter the continental naval powers: the Dutch Republic, France, and Spain.

In 1904, in response to the build-up of the German Kaiserliche Marine'''s High Seas Fleet, Britain decided that a northern base was needed to control the entrances to the North Sea, as part of a revised policy of 'distant' rather than 'close' blockade. First Rosyth in Fife was considered, then Invergordon at Cromarty Firth. Delayed construction left these largely unfortified by the outbreak of the First World War. Scapa Flow had been used many times for British exercises in the years before the war and when the time came for the fleet to move to a northern station, it was chosen for the main base of the British Grand Fleet—unfortified.

John Rushworth Jellicoe, admiral of the Grand Fleet, was perpetually nervous about the possibility of submarine or destroyer attacks on Scapa Flow. Whilst the fleet spent almost the first year of the war patrolling the west coast of the British Isles, their base at Scapa was defensively reinforced, beginning with over sixty blockships sunk in the many entrance channels between the southern islands to enable the use of submarine nets and booms. These blocked approaches were backed by minefields, artillery, and concrete barriers.

Two attempts to enter the harbour were made by German U-boats during the war and neither was successful:
 tried to enter in November 1914. A trawler searching for submarines rammed her, causing her to leak, prompting her flight and surfacing; one crew member died. 
 made a foray in October 1918 but encountered the sophisticated defences then in place. It was detected by hydrophones before entering the anchorage, then destroyed by shore-triggered mines, killing all 36 hands.

After the Battle of Jutland, the German High Seas Fleet rarely ventured out of its bases at Wilhelmshaven and Kiel and in the last two years of the war the British fleet was considered to have such a commanding superiority of the seas that some components moved south to the first-class dockyard at Rosyth.

The scuttling of the German fleet

Following the German defeat, 74 ships of the Imperial German Navy's High Seas Fleet were interned in Gutter Sound at Scapa Flow pending a decision on their future in the peace Treaty of Versailles.

On 21 June 1919, after seven months of waiting, German Rear Admiral Ludwig von Reuter made the decision to scuttle the fleet because the negotiation period for the treaty had lapsed with no word of a settlement. He was not kept informed that there had been a last-minute extension to finalise the details.

After waiting for the bulk of the British fleet to leave on exercises, he gave the order to scuttle the ships to prevent their falling into British hands. The Royal Navy made desperate efforts to board the ships to prevent the sinkings, but the German crews had spent the idle months preparing for the order, welding bulkhead doors open, laying charges in vulnerable parts of the ships, and quietly dropping important keys and tools overboard so valves could not be shut.

The Royal Navy managed to beach the battleship , the light cruisers Emden, Nürnberg, and Frankfurt and 18 destroyers whereas 53 ships, the vast bulk of the High Seas Fleet, were sunk. Nine German sailors died on some of these ships when British forces opened fire as they attempted to scuttle the ships, reputedly the last casualties of the war.

 was amongst the ships the British managed to beach. This Emden should not be confused with her predecessor, destroyed in the Battle of Cocos on 9 November 1914 by the Australian light cruiser .

At least seven of the scuttled German ships and a number of sunken British ships can today be visited by divers.

Salvage operation
Although many of the larger ships turned turtle and came to rest upside down or on their sides in relatively deep water (25–45 m), some—including the battlecruiser —were left with parts of their superstructure or upturned bows still protruding from the water or just below the surface.

These ships posed a severe hazard to navigation, and small boats, trawlers and drifters, moving around the Flow regularly became snagged on them with the rise and fall of the tides. The Admiralty initially declared that there would be no attempt at salvage, that the sunken hulks would remain where they were, to 'rest and rust.' In the first few years after the war, there was abundant scrap metal as a result of the huge quantities of leftover tanks, artillery and ordnance. By the early 1920s, the situation had changed.

In 1922, the Admiralty invited tenders from interested parties for the salvage of the sunken ships, although at the time few believed that it would be possible to raise the deeper wrecks. The contract went to a wealthy engineer and scrap metal merchant, Ernest Cox, who created a new company, a division of Cox & Danks Ltd, for the venture, and so began what is often called the greatest maritime salvage operation of all time.

During the next eight years, Cox and his workforce of divers, engineers, and labourers engaged in the complex task of raising the sunken fleet. First the relatively small destroyers were winched to the surface using pontoons and floating docks to be sold for scrap to help finance the operation, then the bigger battleships and battlecruisers were lifted, by sealing the multiple holes in the wrecks, and welding to the hulls long steel tubes which protruded above the water, for use as airlocks. In this fashion the submerged hulls were made into air-tight chambers and raised with compressed air, still inverted, back to the surface.

Cox endured bad luck and frequent fierce storms which often ruined his work, swamping and re-sinking ships which had just been raised. At one stage, during the General Strike of 1926, the salvage operation was about to grind to a halt due to a lack of coal to feed the many boilers for the water pumps and generators. Cox ordered that the abundant fuel bunkers of the sunken (but only partly submerged) battlecruiser  be broken into to extract the coal with mechanical grabs, allowing work to continue.

Although he ultimately lost money on the contract, Cox kept going, employing new technology and methods as conditions dictated. By 1939, Cox and Metal Industries Ltd. (the company that he had sold out to in 1932) had successfully raised 45 of the 52 scuttled ships. The last, the massive , was raised from a record depth of 45 metres just before work was suspended with the start of the Second World War, before being towed to Rosyth where it was broken up in 1946.

A Morse key recovered from the battleship Grosser Kurfürst during the salvage is displayed at a Fife museum.

 Second World War 

Primarily because of its great distance from German airfields, Scapa Flow was again selected as the main British naval base during the Second World War.

The strong defences built during the First World War had fallen into disrepair. Defence against air attack was inadequate and blockships sunk to stop U-boats from penetrating had largely collapsed. While there were anti-submarine nets in place over the three main entrances, they were made only of single-stranded looped wire; there was also a severe lack of the patrolling destroyers and other anti-submarine craft that had previously been available. Efforts began belatedly to repair peacetime neglect, but were not completed in time to prevent a successful penetration by enemy forces.

On 14 October 1939, under the command of Günther Prien,  penetrated Scapa Flow and sank the First World War-era battleship  anchored in Scapa Bay. After firing its first torpedo salvo, the submarine turned to make its escape; but, upon realising that there was no immediate threat from surface vessels, it returned for another attack. The second torpedo salvo blew a  hole in the Royal Oak, which flooded and quickly capsized. Of the 1,400-man crew, 833 were lost. The wreck is now a protected war grave.H. J. Weaver, Nightmare at Scapa Flow: the truth about the sinking of HMS Royal Oak (Cressrelles, 1980). John Gunther in December 1939 called the attack "the single most extraordinary feat of the war so far".

Three days after the submarine attack, four Luftwaffe Junkers Ju 88 bombers of Kampfgeschwader 1/30 led by group commander Hauptmann Fritz Doench raided Scapa Flow on 17 October in one of the first bombing attacks on Britain during the war. The attack badly damaged an old base ship, the decommissioned battleship , which was then beached at Ore Bay by a tug. One man died and 25 were injured. One of the bombers was shot down by No 1 gun of 226 Heavy Anti-Aircraft Battery on Hoy. Three of the crew died, while the radio operator Fritz Ambrosius was badly burned but managed to parachute down.

New blockships were sunk, booms and mines were placed over the main entrances, coast defence and anti-aircraft batteries were installed at crucial points, and Winston Churchill ordered the construction of a series of causeways to block the eastern approaches to Scapa Flow; they were built by Italian prisoners of war held in Orkney, who also built the Italian Chapel. These "Churchill Barriers" now provide road access from Mainland to Burray and South Ronaldsay, but block maritime traffic. An air base, RAF Grimsetter (which later became HMS Robin), was built and commissioned in 1940.

 Today 

Use by the petroleum industry

Scapa Flow is one of the transfer and processing points for North Sea oil. The Claymore and Tartan oil fields also feed into this line.

 Scapa Flow Visitor Centre 

The Scapa Flow Visitor Centre is at Lyness on Hoy (from Háey meaning high island) the second largest of Orkney. Morning to evening ferries run from Houton on the Mainland.

It occupies a converted naval fuel pumping station and storage tank and next to it is a round stone-built battery emplacement and artillery gun as well as other decommissioned arsenal. It features a large model of the island, Scapa Flow and of the German warships.

Scapa distillery, a Scotch whisky distillery is located on the shore.

Scuba diving
The wreckage of the remaining seven ships of the German fleet (and some other sites such as the blockships) has become increasingly popular as a venue for recreational scuba divers, and is regularly listed in dive magazines and internet forums among the top dive sites in the UK, Europe, and even the world. Although other locations, for example the Pacific regions, offer warmer water and better visibility, there are very few other sites which can offer such an abundance of large, historic wrecks lying in close proximity and shallow, relatively benign diving conditions. As of 2010, at least twelve "live aboard" boats—mostly converted trawlers with bunk rooms in their former holds—take recreational divers out to the main sites, primarily from the main harbour at Stromness. Diving provides a substantial amount of trade and income for the local economy.

Divers must first obtain a permit from the Island Harbour Authorities, which is available through diving shops and centres. The wrecks are mostly located at depths of 35 to 50 metres. Divers are permitted to enter the wrecks, but not to retrieve artefacts located within 100 metres of any wreck. However, time and tide has washed broken pieces of ships' pottery and glass bottles into shallow waters and onto beaches. The underwater visibility, which can vary between 2 and 20 metres, is not sufficient to view all the length of most wrecks at once; however, current technology is now allowing 3D images of them to be seen.

The important wrecks are:

German battleships
The three sister battleships of the : ,  and  formed the main component of the 3rd Battleship Squadron which took part in fierce fighting at the Battle of Jutland far off the coast of Jutland, Denmark (31 May to 1 June 1916) and their upturned hulls are around 25 m deep. Never raised, they have been salvaged incrementally: armour plate blasted away and non-ferrous metals removed. They form highly rated dive sites chiefly due to their depth.

German light cruisers

Other vessels
Also, some large items from many of the ship hulls that were raised (such as the main gun turrets, which fell away from the ships as they capsized) were never salvaged, and still rest on the seabed in close proximity to the impact craters gouged by the scuttled ships.

War grave wrecks

Curse
According to legend, a curse was placed on Scapa long ago by a witch. She buried a thimble in the sand at Nether Scapa, and until it was found no more whales would be caught in the area.

Gallery

See also
Glimps Holm
Lamb Holm
Ness Battery
Scapa (disambiguation)

References and sources
References

Sources
  Describes the scuttling of the High Seas Fleet.
 Thomson, William P. L. (2008). The New History of Orkney. Edinburgh: Birlinn. .
  A comprehensive guide to diving the wrecks and reefs of Scapa Flow.

Further reading
 Booth, Tony. Cox's Navy: Salvaging the German High Seas Fleet at Scapa Flow 1924–1931. Barnsley: Pen & Sword Maritime, 2005. 
 Brown, Malcolm & Patricia Meehan. Scapa Flow. London: Pan Books, 2002. .
 Konstam, Angus. Scapa Flow: The Defences of Britain's Great Fleet Anchorage 1914–45''. Oxford: Osprey Publishing, 2009. 
Dive Scapa Flow by Rod Macdonald. Whittles Publishing

External links 

 Scapa Flow Visitor Centre and Museum
 Scuttling of the High Seas Fleet at Scapa Flow
 Listing of German and scuttled ships
 Scapa Flow Marine Archaeology Project 
 Orkney Wireless Museum (in Kirkwall)
 Ness Battery: A Second World War coast battery near Stromness
 Website for Orkney Defence Interest Network

 
Underwater diving sites in Scotland
Geography of Orkney
Ports and harbours of Scotland
Royal Navy bases in Scotland
Military of Scotland
Port cities and towns of the North Sea